Here's to the People is an album by jazz saxophonist Sonny Rollins, released on the Milestone label in 1991, featuring performances by Rollins with Clifton Anderson, Mark Soskin, Jerome Harris, Bob Cranshaw, Roy Hargrove, Jack DeJohnette, Steve Jordan, and Al Foster.

Reception

The Allmusic review by Scott Yanow states: "Nothing very innovative occurs but the music is quite pleasing."

Track listing
All compositions by Sonny Rollins except as indicated
 "Why Was I Born?" (Oscar Hammerstein II, Jerome Kern) - 6:36  
 "I Wish I Knew" (Mack Gordon, Harry Warren) - 7:45  
 "Here's to the People" - 7:58  
 "Doc Phil" - 5:16  
 "Someone to Watch Over Me  (George Gershwin, Ira Gershwin) - 9:38  
 "Young Roy" - 6:39  
 "Lucky Day" (Ray Henderson) - 5:13  
 "Long Ago (And Far Away)" (Gershwin, Kern) - 5:34
Recorded in NY on August 10 (tracks 3 & 7), 17 (track 4), 23 (tracks 1, 5 & 8) and 27 (tracks 2 & 6), 1991

Personnel
Sonny Rollins - tenor saxophone
Clifton Anderson - trombone (tracks 3, 4 & 7)
Roy Hargrove - trumpet (tracks 2 & 6)
Mark Soskin - piano
Jerome Harris - guitar (tracks 1, 3-5, 7 & 8)
Bob Cranshaw - electric bass
Jack DeJohnette - drums (tracks 1, 4, 5 & 8)
Steve Jordan - drums (tracks 3 & 7)
Al Foster - drums (tracks 2 & 6)

References

1991 albums
Milestone Records albums
Sonny Rollins albums